Sabah National Momogun Party or  (MOMOGUN) was a Kadazan-based party in Sabah, Malaysia that was initially formed as Malaysian National Momogun Party in August 1985. MOMOGUN contested only once, in Malaysian general election, 1986. It later changed its name to Parti Momogun Kebangsaan Sabah (Sabah National Momogun Party). MOMOGUN has since become dormant

General election results

External links
 Facebook Parti Momogun Kebangsaan Sabah

See also
Politics of Malaysia
List of political parties in Malaysia

References

Defunct political parties in Sabah
1985 establishments in Malaysia
Political parties established in 1985
Political parties with year of disestablishment missing